Schmorda is a municipality in the district Saale-Orla-Kreis, in Thuringia, Germany. The area is located in the south central portion of the county, and has, as of late 2008, a population of eighty-six residents.

References

Saale-Orla-Kreis